Lacinipolia stricta, the brown arches moth, is a species of cutworm or dart moth in the family Noctuidae. It is found in North America.

The MONA or Hodges number for Lacinipolia stricta is 10398.

Subspecies
These three subspecies belong to the species Lacinipolia stricta:
 Lacinipolia stricta kappa Barnes & Benjamin, 1925
 Lacinipolia stricta papka Barnes & Benjamin, 1929
 Lacinipolia stricta stricta

References

Further reading

 
 
 
 

Eriopygini
Articles created by Qbugbot
Moths described in 1865